EUROFANZ (before 2016 Eurofan) is an annual international football tournament which began in 2007 for fans of European teams and is held in Lviv, Ukraine.

History 
EUROFANZ is primarily organized by an NGO created by fans of FC Karpaty Lviv. The tournament, known as Eurofan prior to 2016, has been held every summer since 2007. Four teams from two countries participated in the first year. Participation grew to 24 teams in 2013, 2015 and 2017. Eurofanz 2018 will be held on 12–15 July 2018. Eurofanz's official motto is "Football, Fun, Friendz – enjoy EUROFANZ!"

Mission and organisation 
EUROFANZ's mission is to help develop friendship, respect, and a spirit of sportsmanship among European football fans. A charity project—From European fans to Lviv children—is part of the festival; fans are encouraged to bring humanitarian aid and sports equipment for local orphanages.

The festival's programme usually includes opening press conference, the football tournament itself, Lviv city tours and a celebration party after the tournament.

Past Events

2007 
Three Ukrainian and one Russian football team's supporters participated in the first tournament: Karpaty Lviv, Dynamo Kyiv, Shakhtar Donetsk and Zenit Saint Petersburg. Dynamo Kyiv was the winner of Eurofan 2007.

2008 
Six teams competed in the second tournament: Karpaty Lviv, Dnipro Dnipropetrovsk, Dynamo Kyiv, Wales national football team, Wisła Kraków and Zenit Saint Petersburg. Dnipro Dnipropetrovsk won the tournament.

2009 

Teams from multiple European countries participated in Eurofanz 2009:

  Croatia national football team
  Wales national football team
  Atlético Madrid
  Bohemians 1905
  A.C. ChievoVerona
  Rangers
  SC Heerenveen
  F.C. Internazionale Milano
  FC Karpaty Lviv
  Liverpool F.C.
  FC Maestro (amateur team of the Ukrainian musicians)
  TS Ostrovia Ostrów Wielkopolski
  SK Rapid Wien
  FC Schalke 04
  Zenit Saint Petersburg
Scottish supporters of the Rangers team became the winners beating FC Karpaty Lviv 4–1.

2010 
The fourth Eurofanz was held on 8–11 July 2010. "АВМ СПОРТ" company, which represents football brand Umbro, was the technical sponsor of the tournament. Matches were played with footballs made by the well-known manufacturer SELECT. Eurofanz 2010 had 16 participants:
  Belgium national football team
  Czech Republic national football team
  Finland national football team
  Georgia national football team
  Slovenia national football team
  Sweden national football team
  Ukraine national football team
  Wales national football team
  Atlético Madrid
  Hamburger SV
  SC Heerenveen
  F.C. Internazionale Milano
  FC Karpaty Lviv
  Liverpool F.C.
  Paris Saint-Germain F.C.
  Zenit Saint Petersburg
Scottish supporters of the Rangers team became the winners beating FC Karpaty Lviv 4–1.

2011 
Eurofanz 2011 was called Silpo Eurofanz 2011 for sponsorship reasons. It had a record number of participants. The attending club supporters included:
  Liverpool F.C.
  Chievo Verona
  Zenit Saint Petersburg
  Lokomotiv Moscow
  F.C. Copenhagen
  Śląsk Wrocław
  Lechia Gdańsk
  Dinamo Minsk
  Botev Plovdiv
  Dinamo București
  Karpaty Lviv
National team supporters:
  Croatia national football team
  Czech Republic national football team
  Ireland national football team
  Moldova national football team
  Poland national football team
  Slovenia national football team
  Serbia national football team
  Slovakia national football team
  Ukraine national football team
  Sweden national football team
  Wales national football team
and also  Team of Lviv city councillors called "Levy" (Lions).

Supporters of the Slovenia national team became the winners beating Zenit Saint Petersburg 6–5 on penalties (match had ended 1-1).

2012 
Eurofanz 2012 was called the Silpo Eurofanz 2012 for sponsorship reasons and was held from June 28 to July 1. For the first time in tournament history only supporters' national teams were represented, plus Karpaty Lviv and FC Maestro (members of show business):

Supporters of the Romania national team have won the final match, beating FC Maestro 4–3 on penalties (match had ended 0-0).

After the final match, all the participants watched the EURO 2012 final at the Lviv fan zone.

2013 
Eurofanz 2013 was sponsored by the brand Nivea For Men. 24 teams participated, breaking the previous record of 23:

The festival activities included various parties and a poker tournament.

In the final game, the Bulgarian team overcame Dinamo București 6–5 on penalties after full-time ended 1-1.

2014 
22 teams were engaged in the Eurofanz 2014 fan festival:

* Out of competition.

Final: Bulgaria team – Ukraine team – 0:0 (5–4 on penalties).

2015 
Eurofanz 2015 brought together 24 teams from 15 countries:

Final: Bulgaria team – Dinamo Minsk – 1:0.

2016 
In the year 2016, the tournament celebrated its jubilee, so the organizers rebranded its name and official emblem. From now on the tournament was called EUROFANZ.

21 teams participated in the jubilee fan-tournament:

Final: Ukraine team – Dinamo Minsk – 6:2.

2017 
The EUROFANZ 2017 fan-festival was from 29 June to 2 July 2017 (the tournament lasted from 30 June till 2 July).

24 teams participated in the tournament:

Final: Slovenia team – Belarus team – 2:1.

2018 
The EUROFANZ 2018 fan-festival was held from 13 July to 15 July (the final match was scheduled on the day of 2018 FIFA World Cup final)

21 teams participated in the tournament:

Final: Romania team – France team – 2:0.

2019 
The dates for EUROFANZ 2019 are June 28–30, 2019. France is the winner of this edition.

References

External links 
 Official Facebook page

Sport in Lviv
Association football culture
Festivals in Ukraine
Football competitions in the regions of Ukraine
Summer events in Ukraine